Anamera alboguttata is a species of beetle in the family Cerambycidae. It was described by James Thomson in 1864. It is known from Laos, Vietnam, India, Myanmar, and Thailand.

References

Lamiini
Beetles described in 1864